833 Monica is a minor planet orbiting the Sun. Measurements of the lightcurve made in 2010 give a rotation period of 12.09 ± 0.01 hours. It has a diameter of 21.2 km.

References

External links
 
 

000833
Discoveries by Max Wolf
Named minor planets
19160920